George Morell may refer to:

 George W. Morell (1815–1883), civil engineer, lawyer, farmer and Union general in the American Civil War
 George Morell (Michigan judge) (1786–1845), American lawyer and judge

See also
 George Morrell (disambiguation)